Giuseppe Agostino (Reggio Calabria, 25 November 1928 – Rende, 24 March 2014) was a Catholic archbishop.

Biography
Ordained to the priesthood, Agostino was named Archbishop of Santa Severina in 1973 and then archbishop of Crotone-San Severina. In 1998, Agostino was named archbishop of Cosenza-Bisignano, Italy, and retired in 2004.
He died from natural causes at the age of 85.

Notes

1928 births
2014 deaths
People from Reggio Calabria
People from Rende
Roman Catholic archbishops in Italy
Bishops in Calabria